Balule Nature Reserve is a protected area in Limpopo Province, South Africa which forms part of the Greater Kruger National Park as a member of the Associated Private Nature Reserves (APNR). As part of a wildlife conservation initiative, all fences separating APNR reserves – Balule, Timbavati, Klaserie, Umbabat, Grietjie Private Nature Reserve – and the Kruger National Park have been removed. The ecological benefits of this initiative has made the region a popular ecotourism destination and conservation efforts have ensured that the wildlife population includes all of the Big Five game: lion, African bush elephant, African buffalo, African leopard and black rhinoceros.

History 

The Balule area of the Greater Kruger National Park initially consisted several separate fenced game farms. In the early 1990s, landowners decided to remove the fences separating their properties in aid of conservation in order to increase the grazing area for the local wildlife and to diversify the animal gene pool. By the end of the decade, most Balule landowners had joined in the venture creating a much larger area for game to roam unhindered by fences, and hunting was curtailed. Kruger authorities noted the ecological benefits and decided to incorporate the Balule area into the Greater Kruger National Park by removing the fence between the Kruger Park and Klaserie Game Reserve as well as between the Klaserie and Olifants Game Reserves. Today the Balule reserve covers around 40,000 hectares in area (The area periodically extends as more landowners join the initiative and become incorporated).

Geography 

Balule Nature Reserve is situated on the western boundary of the Kruger Park, in the Limpopo province of South Africa, southwest of Phalaborwa, and north of Hoedspruit. The perennial Olifants River flows for approximately 20 km through the center of the reserve. The reserve consists of a number of smaller privately owned parks, these include:

 Olifants River Game Reserve
 Olifants River Eastern Conservancy
 Olifants West Game Reserve
 York Game Reserve
 Parsons Game Reserve
 Olifants North Game Reserve
 Grietjie Game Reserve 
 Jejane
Pridelands Conservancy

Flora and fauna 

Balule is located in the subtropical lowveld, an area with multiple eco-zones resulting in significant variety in the flora with over 336 documented tree species in the region. Baobab trees, fever trees, knobthorns, marula and mopane trees are predominant species in this wooded savannah.

The diverse flora accommodates a diverse array of fauna. More than 220 different kinds of birds inhabit the area including raptor species such as lappet-faced vulture, Pel's fishing owl, martial eagle and impressive larger birds such as kori bustard, ground hornbill and saddle-billed stork. There are over 30 species of mammals ranging from plains game such as zebra, wildebeest and giraffe to predators such as lion, leopard and cheetah. The rivers and other watering holes are home to large herds of hippos and crocodiles, and in the long dry seasons these areas are heavily trafficked by wildlife and safari tour groups alike.

Accommodation 
The Reserve is managed as an eco-tourism destination and there are a number of private commercial game lodges located within the Reserve. The following lodges and camps offer accommodation in the Balule Reserve:

 Grietjie Reserve Accommodation
 Amukela Game Lodge
 Balule River Camp
 Baluleni Safari Lodge
 Campfire Safaris Academy
 Ezulwini Game Lodges
 Greenfire Game Lodge
 Kurhula Wildlife Lodge
 Leopard View Game Lodge
 Masodini Private Game Lodge
 Maninghi Lodge
 Mohlabetsi Safari Lodge
 Mpala Lodge
 Naledi Game Lodge
 Pondoro Game Lodge
 Raptor Retreat Game Lodge
 Sausage Tree Safari Camp
 Struwig Eco Reserve
 Toro Yaka Bush Lodge

See also 

 Associated Private Nature Reserves
 Protected areas of South Africa
 Wildlife of South Africa

References

External links 
 Balule Travel Guide
 Limpopo Tourism Agency
 Game Lodges in the Balule Reserve
 Struwig Eco Reserve
 

Nature conservation in South Africa
Nature reserves in South Africa
Tourism in South Africa